Blade in Hong Kong is a 1985 American action/adventure television film directed by Iranian-born director Reza Badiyi. It is based on a novel by Terry Becker. It stars Terry Lester as a suave private eye who becomes embroiled in a battle against the Hong Kong underworld.

Cast
Terry Lester as Joe Blade
Leslie Nielsen as Harry Ingersoll
Nancy Kwan as Lily
Keye Luke as Chang Chin-tzu 
James Hong as Key Tam
Jean Marie Hon as Mei-Ling   
Ellen Regan as Krista Vale
Anthony Newley as Tommy T
Michael Preston as Charters

References

External links

1985 television films
1985 films
1985 action films
American action adventure films
American television films
Films set in Hong Kong
1980s English-language films
1980s American films